The 1973–74 season was the 94th season of competitive football by Rangers.

Overview
Rangers played a total of 51 competitive matches during the 1973–74 season. This was the club's centenary season, however, the start to the league championship was poor with no goals in the first four home games which left the side with just seven points from their first six league matches. This early blip meant Rangers were always chasing the title and eventually finished third, five points behind champions Celtic.

The League Cup campaign saw an Old Firm semi-final. A 3–1 win for Celtic saw them through to the final. The Scottish Cup did not prove any better as the club exited the competition thanks to a 3–0 defeat to Dundee. The European Cup Winners' Cup run was ended in the second round at the hands of Borussia Mönchengladbach.

Results
All results are written with Rangers' score first.

Scottish First Division

Cup Winners' Cup

Scottish Cup

League Cup

Appearances

See also
 1973–74 in Scottish football
 1973–74 Scottish Cup
 1973–74 Scottish League Cup
 1973–74 European Cup Winners' Cup

References 

Rangers F.C. seasons
Rangers